Jugeli is a Georgian surname. Notable people with the surname include:

Mamuka Jugeli (born 1969), Georgian football player, manager, and scout
Medea Jugeli (1925–2016), Georgian artistic gymnast

Georgian-language surnames